The 2018 Europe's Strongest Man was a strongman competition that took place in Leeds, England on 7 April 2018 at the First Direct Arena. This event was part of the 2018 Giants live tour.

Results of events

Event 1: Max Log Lift 
Notes: A number of athletes were invited to take part in this event only and therefore they did not score points.

Event 2: Deadlift
Weight:  for as many repetitions as possible.
Time Limit: 60 seconds 
Notes: This was completed on an axle deadlift bar.

Event 3: Farmer's Walk
Course Length: 

^ Krzysztof Radzikowski sustained an injury in this event and took no further part in the competition.

^ Vytautas Lalas sustained an injury in this event and took no further part in the competition.

Event 4: Car Walk
Weight:  
Course Length:

Event 5: Atlas Stones

Final Results

References

External links 

Competitions in the United Kingdom
Europe's Strongest Man